Krapivye is a rural locality (a selo) in Seletskoye Rural Settlement, Suzdalsky District, Vladimir Oblast, Russia. The population was 107 as of 2010.

Geography 
Krapivye is located on the Kamenka River, 8 km west of Suzdal (the district's administrative centre) by road. Yanyovo is the nearest rural locality.

References 

Rural localities in Suzdalsky District
Suzdalsky Uyezd